Sir Alan Chambré (4 October 1739 – 20 September 1823) was an English judge.

Life
He was the eldest son of Walter Chambré, of Halhead Hall, Kendal, in Westmorland, a barrister, by his wife, Mary, daughter of Jacob Morland, of Capplethwaite Hall, in the same county. He was born at Kendal on 4 October 1739. After receiving an early education at Kendal Grammar School, he was sent to Sedbergh School, then under the care of Wynne Bateman.

From Sedbergh he went to London, where first of all he entered the office of Forth Wintour, solicitor, in Pall Mall. He also became a member of the Society of Staple Inn;  he moved to the Middle Temple in February 1758, and in November 1764 from the Middle Temple to Gray's Inn. In May 1767 he was called to the bar, and went the northern circuit, of which he soon became one of the leaders. He was elected to the bench of Gray's Inn June 1781, and in 1783 filled the annual office of treasurer.

In 1796, he was appointed recorder of Lancaster. 
On the retirement of Richard Perryn from the judicial bench he was chosen as his successor. In order to qualify for the bench, it was necessary that Chambré should be made a serjeant-at-law. 
As Perryn had retired in the vacation just before the summer circuit, and serjeants could only be called in term, a special act of parliament (39 Geo. III, c. 67) was passed authorising for the first time the appointment of a serjeant in the vacation. 
Under the provisions of this act Chambré received the degree of serjeant on 2 July 1799, and on the same day was appointed a baron of the exchequer. 
Lord Chief Justice James Eyre dying five days after the special act had received the royal assent, the same difficulty again occurred, and a general act (39 Geo. III, c. 113) was then passed in the same session authorising the appointment of any barrister to the degree of serjeant during the vacation if done for the purpose of filling up a vacancy on the bench. Lord Eldon was the first judge appointed under the provisions of this act.

On 13 June 1800, Chambré was transferred to the court of common pleas, as successor to Sir Francis Buller. In this court he remained until December 1815, when he resigned his seat, and having sat on the bench more than fifteen years became entitled to a pension of £2,000 a year by virtue of an act passed in the same year in which he had been appointed a judge (39 Geo. III, c. 110).

Chambré died at the Crown Inn, Harrogate, on 20 September 1823, in his 84th year and was buried in the family vault in Kendal parish church, where a monument was erected to his memory. He was never married, and was succeeded in his estates by his nephew, Thomas Chambré.

References

Attribution

1739 births
1823 deaths
English barristers
18th-century English judges
Barons of the Exchequer
19th-century English judges